Eldikan (Elcikeen) is an urban locality (an urban-type settlement) in Ust-Maysky District of the Sakha Republic, Russia, located on the right bank of the Aldan River,  northeast of Ust-Maya, the administrative center of the district. As of the 2010 Census, its population was 1,515.

History
It was established in 1941 as a river port, as a base for the developing gold mining activities on the Yudoma and Allakh-Yun Rivers. Urban-type settlement status was granted to it in 1948, when it became the administrative center of Allakh-Yunsky District. It lost this role again in 1953 with the merger of the district back into Ust-Maysky District.

Administrative and municipal status
Within the framework of administrative divisions, the urban-type settlement of Eldikan, together with one rural locality (the selo of 8-y km), is incorporated within Ust-Maysky District as the Settlement of Eldikan. As a municipal division, the Settlement of Eldikan is incorporated within Ust-Maysky Municipal District as Eldikan Urban Settlement.

Economy and infrastructure
Eldikan serves as an important distribution center for the district's gold mining industry, and as an energy center. Agricultural products produced here include vegetables, pigs, horses, cows, potatoes, cabbage, and fish.

Eldikan itself, however, remains only connected to the outside world by ship on the Aldan River during the ice-free period, or via an ice road along the frozen river in winter. There is also a winter road along the Aldan to Ust-Maya and a further  onwards to Amga, from which an all-weather road connects to Nizhny Bestyakh near the republic's capital of Yakutsk.

A new year-round road is planned which will connect Eldikan with the settlement of Khandyga on the Kolyma Highway. The construction of the first section, to Dzhebariki-Khaya, began in 2009.

A small airport in Eldikan is no longer in regular use.

See also
Kyllakh Range

References

Notes

Sources
Official website of the Sakha Republic. Registry of the Administrative-Territorial Divisions of the Sakha Republic. Ust-Maysky District. 

Urban-type settlements in the Sakha Republic